Miranda Jane Richardson (born 3 March 1958) is an English actress. She made her film debut playing Ruth Ellis in Dance with a Stranger (1985) and went on to receive Academy Award nominations for Damage (1992) and Tom & Viv (1994). A seven-time BAFTA Award nominee, she won the BAFTA Award for Best Actress in a Supporting Role for Damage. She has also been nominated for seven Golden Globe Awards, winning twice for Enchanted April (1992) and the TV film Fatherland (1994). 

After graduating from the Bristol Old Vic Theatre School, Richardson began her career in 1979 and made her West End debut in the 1981 play Moving, before being nominated for the 1987 Olivier Award for Best Actress for A Lie of the Mind. Her television credits include  Blackadder (1986–1989), A Dance to the Music of Time (1997), Merlin (1998), The Lost Prince (2003), Gideon's Daughter (2006), the sitcom The Life and Times of Vivienne Vyle (2007), and Rubicon (2010). She was nominated for the 2015 Primetime Emmy Award for Outstanding Narrator for Operation Orangutan.

Her other films include Empire of the Sun (1987), The Crying Game (1992), The Apostle (1997), Sleepy Hollow (1999), Chicken Run (2000), The Hours (2002), Spider (2002), The Phantom Of The Opera (2004), Harry Potter and the Goblet of Fire (2005), The Young Victoria (2009), Made in Dagenham (2010), Belle (2013), and Stronger (2017).

Early life 
Richardson was born in Southport, Lancashire. She recalls "a cinema about 50 yards from my house. So Saturday mornings were spent with The ABC Minors: the Saturday cinema club with the theme song set to the tune of Blaze Away by Abe Holzmann, a red ball bouncing over the lyrics so you could sing along. As I got older, I would go to the cinema by myself to watch matinees of westerns and historical Technicolor dramas."

Career

Theatre 
Richardson enrolled at the Bristol Old Vic Theatre School, where she studied alongside Daniel Day-Lewis and Jenny Seagrove, having started out with juvenile performances in Cinderella and Lord Arthur Savile's Crime at the Southport Dramatic Club.

Richardson joined the Manchester Library Theatre in 1979 as an assistant stage manager, followed by a number of appearances in repertory theatre. Her London stage debut was in Moving at the Queen's Theatre in 1981. She found recognition in the West End for a series of stage performances, ultimately receiving an Olivier Award nomination for her performance in A Lie of the Mind, and, in 1996, she appeared in the single-actor theatrical adaptation of Orlando at the Edinburgh Festival. She returned to the London stage in May 2009 to play the lead role in Wallace Shawn's new play, Grasses of a Thousand Colours at the Royal Court Theatre. Richardson has said that she prefers new works rather than the classics because of the history which goes with them.

Film and television 
In 1985, Richardson made her film debut as Ruth Ellis, the last woman to be hanged in the United Kingdom, in the biographical drama Dance with a Stranger. Around the same time, Richardson played a comedic Queen Elizabeth I, aka Queenie, in the British television comedy Blackadder II.

Following Dance with a Stranger, Richardson turned down numerous parts in which her character was unstable or disreputable, including the Glenn Close role in Fatal Attraction. In this period, she appeared in Empire of the Sun (1987). In an episode of the TV series The Storyteller ("The Three Ravens", 1988), she played a witch. Meanwhile, she had returned in guest roles in one episode each in Blackadder the Third (1987) and Blackadder Goes Forth (1989). She returned to play Queenie in the Christmas special Blackadder's Christmas Carol (1988) and, later, a special edition for the millennium Blackadder: Back and Forth.

Other television roles include Pamela Flitton in A Dance to the Music of Time (1997), Miss Gilchrist in St. Ives (1998), Bettina the interior decorator in Absolutely Fabulous, Queen Elspeth, Snow White's stepmother, in Snow White: The Fairest of Them All (2001), and Queen Mary in The Lost Prince (2003).

Richardson has appeared in supporting roles in film, including Vanessa Bell in The Hours, Lady Van Tassel in Sleepy Hollow and Patsy Carpenter in The Evening Star. She also won acclaim for her performances in The Crying Game and Enchanted April, for which she won a Golden Globe. She received Academy Award nominations for her performances in Damage and Tom & Viv.

Her film credits also include Kansas City (1996), The Apostle (1997) and Wah-Wah (2005). In 2002, she performed a triple-role in the thriller Spider.

Richardson also appeared as Queen Rosalind of Denmark in The Prince and Me and as the ballet mistress Madame Giry in the film version of the Andrew Lloyd Webber musical The Phantom of the Opera (2004). In 2005, she appeared in the role of Rita Skeeter, the toxic Daily Prophet journalist in Harry Potter and the Goblet of Fire. She also did the voice for Corky in The Adventures of Bottle Top Bill and His Best Friend Corky (2005), an Australian animated series for children. In 2006, she appeared in Gideon's Daughter. She played Mrs. Claus in the film Fred Claus (2007).

Richardson appeared in the BBC sitcom, The Life and Times of Vivienne Vyle.

In 2008, Richardson was cast in a leading role in original AMC pilot, Rubicon. She plays Katherine Rhumor, a New York socialite who finds herself drawn into the central intrigue of a think tank after the death of her husband.

Additionally, she played Labour politician Barbara Castle in the British film Made in Dagenham.

In 2014, Richardson was cast as Queen Ulla in Maleficent, where she was to play the titular character's aunt, but her role was cut from the film during post-production. In 2015, she played Sybil Birling in Helen Edmundson's BBC One adaptation of J. B. Priestley's An Inspector Calls.

Personal life
Richardson's hobbies include dog walking, gardening and falconry, and she started playing the cello in 2013. She trains a falcon named Cassiopeia.

Filmography

Awards and nominations

References

External links 

 
 
 

1958 births
Alumni of Bristol Old Vic Theatre School
Audiobook narrators
Best Supporting Actress BAFTA Award winners
Best Musical or Comedy Actress Golden Globe (film) winners
Best Supporting Actress Golden Globe (television) winners
English film actresses
English stage actresses
English television actresses
English radio actresses
English voice actresses
Living people
People from Southport
20th-century English actresses
21st-century English actresses
Actresses from Lancashire